Long-range surveillance (LRS) teams (pronounced "lurse") were elite, specially-trained surveillance units of the United States Army employed for clandestine operation by Military Intelligence for gathering direct human intelligence information deep within enemy territory. Classic LRS employment is to infiltrate deep into enemy territory, construct hide and surveillance sites, and provide continuous surveillance/special reconnaissance of an intelligence target of key interest.

LRS teams allow 24-hour surveillance and analysis coverage unlike unmanned aerial vehicles (UAVs), manned aircraft, and most satellites. Assuming there is no mission compromise, these teams typically remain in position for up to six days, as determined by the availability of food and water.

As a result of an evaluation conducted using computer-modelling the U.S. Army's senior leadership made the decision to deactivate all active-duty and National Guard LRS units. By the end of January 2017 the three active-duty LRS companies had ceased to exist, with its personnel being reassigned to other units. All National Guard LRS units followed suit in 2018. Army LRS units are officially a thing of the past.

Mission

Long Range Surveillance Units (LRSU) have four primary missions and five secondary missions as per FM 3-55.93 Long Range Surveillance Unit Operations. The four primary missions are surveillance, zone and area reconnaissance, target acquisition, and target interdiction. Combat assessment/battle damage assessment is mentioned as not a standalone LRSU mission but inherent to all LRSUs. The five secondary missions are able to be completed if given the proper training and time to coordinate. The secondary missions include route reconnaissance, emplacement and recovery of sensors, pathfinder operations, personnel recovery and combat search and rescue, and chemical detection and radiological surveillance and monitoring operations.

LRS operations are characterized by the following:

 Clandestine LRS operations require operational security (OPSEC) and personnel security (PERSEC) measures and procedures before, during, and after mission employment.  This is to protect the individual team members as well as maintain operational integrity of the LRS cell.
 Team members depend on stealth, cover, concealment, infantry, and Ranger skills.
 Team members avoid contact with enemy forces and local population.
 Teams are employed to obtain timely information.
 Teams have restricted mobility in the area of operations.
 Team members depend on communications, knowing the enemy's order of battle, and equipment identification skills.
 The surveillance or reconnaissance area is small, has a specified route, or is a specific location or installation.
 Team equipment and supplies are limited to what can be man packed or cached.
 Teams require detailed intelligence preparation of the battlefield (IPB) and debriefing from the Intelligence Officer (G2) for employment.

Organization 

LRS units (LRSU) are infantry company-size elements that are assets within a battlefield surveillance brigade's Reconnaissance & Surveillance Squadron (R&S Squadron) designated as US Army Cavalry but are functionally Airborne infantry units. The LRSU is structured as an LRS Company comprising three LRS detachments, a communications Platoon, and a Troop Headquarters. Within the LRS company, the LRS detachments typically have designated specialties.  Typically, there are three teams, also known as "DETs." 1st DET typically specializes in mountainous terrain/warfare. 2nd DET is HALO (High Altitude, Low Open), specializing in airborne operations.  This means jumping from a high-performance military aircraft at an altitude in excess of ten thousand feet and deploying parachutes at one to two thousand feet. 2nd DET can also perform HAHO (High Altitude, High Open) operations. This means jumping from a high-performance military aircraft in excess of ten thousand feet and deploying parachutes shortly after leaving the aircraft. 3rd DET is the dive detachment, specializing in water-borne operations such as scuba diving and infiltrating harbors and ports as well as employing the Zodiac.
LRS detachments are organized as five unsupported LRS teams.

LRS Team composition 

As with LRRP units of the past each US Army LRS team is composed of six soldiers:

 Team Leader (TL) Staff Sergeant (E-6) Preferably Ranger qualified
 Assistant Team Leader (ATL) Sergeant (E-5) Preferably Ranger qualified
 Senior Scout Observer (SSO) Specialist/Corporal (E-4)
 Scout Observer (SO) Specialist/Corporal (E-4)
 Radio Telephone Operator (RTO) Specialist (E-4)
 Assistant Radio Telephone Operator (ARTO) Specialist (E-4)

All positions can be held by (E-1 up) to fill positions (upon meeting unit requirements)

Reconnaissance and surveillance squadrons (R&S squadrons) 

United States Army long-range surveillance units are being reorganized into the recently introduced battlefield surveillance brigades (BfSBs). These brigades contain a brigade headquarters and headquarters company (HHC), two Military Intelligence (MI) battalions, and a reconnaissance and surveillance (R&S) squadron.

The R&S squadrons conduct the same missions as RSTA units, but the R&S capabilities are vastly broader and encompass all aspects of ISR. Additionally, LRS units have the added capability of conducting strategic-level long-range surveillance (LRS) missions deep behind enemy lines. Due to this specialized capability, the R&S capability of LRS units is significantly more comprehensive than that of RSTA units. The missions of RSTA units may require them to make and maintain contact with the enemy, thereby forfeiting their ability to remain concealed and avoid detection and/or engagement. The only units within the United States Army to specialize in the capability and skill of the LRS mission are those of the LRS units within the BfSBs, Special Forces (SF) Operational Detachments-Alpha (SFODAs, ODAs, or A-Teams), and the Ranger Regimental Reconnaissance Company (RRC) of the 75th Ranger Regiment.

The BfSB’s R&S squadron is composed of one LRS unit (i.e., Company C), which contains 15 LRS teams. Additionally, the R&S squadron also has two Cavalry troops (each containing two platoons) that conduct basic mounted and dismounted operations, and a headquarters and headquarters troop (HHT).

For a standard six-soldier LRS team, the primary method of insertion/infiltration behind enemy lines is at night by helicopter (night-time heliborne), while secondary methods include airborne and waterborne operations. In recent low-intensity conflicts, additional covert methods have been added to enable enhanced operational capabilities. Airborne reconnaissance missions are conducted by the three aforementioned types of United States Army units: LRS units, SF ODAs, and the Ranger RRC.

Contrast with Reconnaissance, Surveillance, and Target Acquisition (RSTA) Units 

Although both are types of units in the United States Army, LRS units (Airborne Infantry) are not to be confused with the newer concept of RSTA units (non-Airborne Cavalry).

As part of the Army-wide transfer to brigade combat teams (BCTs), all combat divisions and separate brigades are transitioning to RSTA units. RSTA units also have added light vehicle support in the form of Humvees (HMMWVs) and M3 Bradley Cavalry Fighting Vehicles (CFVs), due to being commissioned as Cavalry.

LRS units, in contrast, do not utilize a larger vehicle support element. As previously stated, RSTA units are not Airborne-capable, whereas most LRS units are. However, exceptions are the RSTA squadrons of the 2nd BCT (Airborne), 11th Airborne Division; the 173rd Airborne BCT; and the four RSTA units in the 82nd Airborne Division).

By doctrine, RSTA units do not require their leadership positions to be filled by Ranger-qualified commissioned and noncommissioned officers, whereas LRS units desire additional skills and special qualifications.

Equipment 

LRS Soldiers typically carry weapons that include the following: M4 carbine, M9 pistol, M249 Squad Automatic Weapon (SAW/LMG), M203 grenade launcher, as well as mission-specific gear, including (but not limited to), optics, A/V recording devices, secure communications gear, etc.

Training 

Since LRSUs are Airborne operations capable, the Soldiers serving in these units must be Airborne qualified (i.e., parachutists). Furthermore, many leadership ranks are commanded by both commissioned and noncommissioned officers that are Ranger qualified.

LRS leaders typically graduate from the United States Army Reconnaissance and Surveillance Leaders Course (see link and course list below).

LRS soldiers are often graduates of other specialized military courses and training, including:

 U.S. Army Air Assault Course
 U.S. Army Jumpmaster Course
 U.S. Army Military Free Fall Parachutist Course
 U.S. Army Pathfinder Course
 U.S. Army Ranger Course
 U.S. Army Reconnaissance and Surveillance Leaders Course (RSLC)1,2
 U.S. Army Special Forces Combat Diver Qualification Course (SFCDQC)
 U.S. Army Special Forces Sniper Course (SFSC)3
 U.S. Army Special Forces Waterborne Infiltration Course (SFWIC)
 U.S. Army Special Operations Combat Medic (SOCM)
 U.S. Army Survival, Evasion, Resistance, and Escape (SERE)
 U.S. Army Sniper Course

United States Army LRSUs conduct training exercises and exchange programs with various U.S. allies. In recent years these exercises have included deployments to England, Germany, France, Hungary, and Italy. Combined/Joint training exercises have involved units from Britain’s TA SAS, France's 13e RDP, Belgium's ESR, Italy's 9th Parachute Assault Regiment, and Germany's FSLK200.

International Special Training Center (ISTC), which trains NATO Special Operations Forces (SOFs) and similar units in advanced individual patrolling, battlefield medicine, close quarter battle (CQB), sniper, survival, planning, and recognition skills. Established in 1979, ISTC was originally named the International Long-Range Reconnaissance Patrol School (ILRRPS), and was formerly located in Weingarten, Germany before later moving to Pfullendorf, Germany.

 Formerly: United States Army Long-Range Reconnaissance and Surveillance Leaders Course (LRRSLC)
 Formerly: United States Army Long-Range Surveillance Leaders Course (LRSLC)
 Formerly: United States Army Special Operations Target Interdiction Course (SOTIC)

See also 
 Company F, 425th Infantry—Michigan NG Ranger and LRS unit
 FernspähkompanieSpecial unit of the German Bundeswehr similar to LRS
 Honourable Artillery Company and 4/73 Battery—Similar elements in the British Army
 Long-range penetration
 Long-range reconnaissance patrol
 Long-range surveillance company
 Long-range surveillance detachment
 Patruljekompagniet—The only LRS unit of the Danish Armed Forces

Citations

General and cited sources 
 Long Range Surveillance: True test for ‘quiet professional’
 Eyes Behind the Lines: US Army Long-Range Reconnaissance and Surveillance Units
 US Army Field Manual 7-93 Long-Range Surveillance Unit Operations. (FM 7-93)
 PDF downloadable version of the US Army’s Long-Range Surveillance Unit Operations Field Manual. (FM 7-93) This manual provides doctrine, tactics, techniques, and procedures on how long-range surveillance units perform combat operations as a part of the Army's new battlefield surveillance brigades.
 LRSU: Eyes of the Commander by Staff Sergeants Brent W. Dick and Kevin M. Lydon
 "Riding With the Posse Part I" By Mike Gifford
 International Special Training Center and NATO celebrate 30 years of teaching special forces. (July 2, 2009) By: Maj. Jennifer Johnson, 7th Army Joint Multinational Training Command Public Affairs.

External links 
 
 XVIII Airborne Corps Long-Range Surveillance Recruiting

Army reconnaissance units and formations
Military intelligence units and formations
Reconnaissance units and formations of the United States Army